James Garfield Stewart (November 17, 1880 – April 3, 1959) was an American Republican politician from Cincinnati, Ohio. He served as mayor of Cincinnati from 1938 to 1947 and then as justice on the Ohio Supreme Court from 1947 to 1959. Stewart's son Potter (1915 - 1985) was an Associate Justice of the United States Supreme Court.  Another son, Zeph Stewart, was the master of Lowell House and head of the Classics department at Harvard.  His daughter was Irene Potter Stewart Taylor, of Cincinnati, Ohio.

Life and career
Stewart was born in Springfield, Ohio, the son of Mary Emily (Durbin) and James Eli Stewart, and graduated from Kenyon College in 1902. He graduated from Cincinnati Law School and was admitted to the bar in 1905. He opened a private practice in Springfield for three years before joining Hugh L. Nichols' firm in Cincinnati in 1908. He was elected to City Council in 1934, and was Mayor 1938-1947.

March 5, 1947, Governor Thomas J. Herbert nominated Stewart to the seat on the Ohio Supreme Court vacated by the resignation of Charles S. Bell. He was re-elected in 1948, 1952 and 1958. He died  April 3, 1959 after giving a speech in Kentucky. His funeral was at Christ Church in Cincinnati, with burial in Springfield.

Stewart and Harriet L. Potter were married in 1911, and later divorced.

References

External links

Mayors of Cincinnati
Justices of the Ohio Supreme Court
1880 births
1959 deaths
Kenyon College alumni
University of Cincinnati College of Law alumni
Politicians from Springfield, Ohio
Ohio Republicans
20th-century American judges